Adrian Hyland is an Australian writer of non-fiction and crime fiction.

Life 
Hyland lived for many years in outback communities of Australia after graduating from Melbourne University in literature, classics and Chinese language. Family circumstances brought him and his wife back to Victoria, where he now lives.

Writing career 
Hyland's two crime novels feature young indigenous woman Emily Tempest, the daughter of an Aboriginal mother and white father who has studied at Melbourne University. In the first novel, Diamond Dove, she is an amateur detective, but by the second, Gunshot Road, she is employed as an Aboriginal community police officer.

Hyland was living at St Andrews, Victoria when the Black Saturday bushfires of 2009 swept through the area. He wrote an account of the experiences of local police officer A/Sergeant Roger Wood, who was in charge at Kinglake on 7 February 2009, in his book Kinglake 350.

His books have been published internationally, including in Britain and the US, and translated into a variety of languages, including German, French, Swedish and Czech.

Bibliography

Novels 
Emily Tempest series
 Diamond Dove (2006)
 Gunshot Road (2010)
Other novels
 Canticle Creek (2021)

Non-fiction 
 Kinglake 350 (2011)

Awards 
 2007 winner Ned Kelly Awards for Crime Writing—Best First Novel for Diamond Dove
 2010 shortlisted Colin Roderick Award for Gunshot Road
 2011 highly commended Western Australian Premier's Book Awards—Non-Fiction for Kinglake 350
 2012 shortlisted Prime Minister's Literary Awards—Non-Fiction for Kinglake 350
 2012 shortlisted The Age Book of the Year Awards—Non-Fiction Prize for Kinglake 350

References

Living people
21st-century Australian novelists
Australian crime writers
Australian male novelists
Australian non-fiction writers
Ned Kelly Award winners
21st-century Australian male writers
Year of birth missing (living people)
Male non-fiction writers